The 2012 Speedway Grand Prix season was the 67th edition of the official World Championship and the 18th season of the Speedway Grand Prix era, deciding the FIM Speedway World Championship. It was the twelfth series under the promotion of Benfield Sports International, an IMG company. The series began on 31 March in Auckland and finish on 6 October in  Torun.

The Australian rider Chris Holder became World Champion, making him the youngest gold medalist since the start of the Speedway Grand Prix series in 1995. Nicki Pedersen returned to the World Championship podium finishing second, while the American veteran Greg Hancock won the bronze medal.

Qualification 

For the 2012 season there will be 15 permanent riders, joined at each Grand Prix by one wild card and two track reserves.

2011 Grand Prix 

The top eight riders from the 2011 championship qualified as of right:

  (1) Greg Hancock
  (2) Andreas Jonsson
  (3) Jarosław Hampel
  (4) Jason Crump
  (5) Tomasz Gollob
  (6) Emil Sayfutdinov
  (7) Kenneth Bjerre
  (8) Chris Holder

Grand Prix Challenge 

The top eight riders from the 2011 championship were joined by three riders who qualified via the Grand Prix Challenge.

  (12) Antonio Lindbäck
  (13) Bjarne Pedersen
  (14) Peter Ljung

Nominations 

The final four riders were nominated by series promoters, Benfield Sports International, following the completion of the 2011 season.

  (9) Fredrik Lindgren
  (10) Nicki Pedersen
  (11) Chris Harris
  (15) Hans Andersen

Qualified Substitutes 

  (19) Martin Vaculík
  (20) Krzysztof Kasprzak
  (21) Leon Madsen
  (22) Sebastian Ułamek
  (23) Krzysztof Buczkowski
  (24) Joonas Kylmäkorpi

Calendar

Classification

See also 
 2012 Individual Speedway Junior World Championship

References

External links 
 SpeedwayWorld.tv - SGP news

 
2012
World Individual